Sebastian Gorzny (born January 24, 2004) is an American tennis player.

Gorzny has a career high ITF junior combined ranking of 38 achieved on 17 January 2022. At the 2019 USTA under-16 nationals in Kalamazoo, Michigan, Gorzny was in a coma for four days after a mosquito bite left him with an infection in his brain.

Gorzny won the 2022 Wimbledon Championships – Boys' doubles title.

Junior Grand Slam titles

Doubles: 1 (1 title)

References

External links

2004 births
Living people
American male tennis players
Sportspeople from Irvine, California
Wimbledon junior champions
Grand Slam (tennis) champions in boys' doubles
21st-century American people
Tennis people from California